Marcelo Alejandro Córdoba (born Marcelo Alejandro Córdoba in Buenos Aires, Argentina on November 21, 1973) is an Argentine actor.

Biography 
After a few years of living in México, he was in the cast of the 2005 telenovela Alborada, which was produced by Carla Estrada. In 2006, producer Roberto Hernández Vázquez convened and Cordoba joined the cast of Heridas de amor, a new version of 1991's, Valeria y Maximiliano. Also in 2006, he was in the cast of Amar sin límites.

In 2007, again Carla Estrada would call for action Fernando Colunga and Susana González in Pasión. In 2008 he starred in Juro que te amo with Ana Brenda and Jose Ron. In 2009, worked in Sortilegio production of Carla Estrada as Roberto Castelar.

In 2010, he played the antagonist in the telenovela Mar de amor, performed a cameo on the telenovela Llena de amor y participated in the chapter "Maria, fanática" in the third season of Mujeres asesinas.

He is Superior Naval and Oceanic Engineer, graduated from Polytechnic University of Buenos Aires, Argentina.

Filmography

Awards And Nominations

References

External links 
 Official site of Marcelo Córdoba
 Biography of Marcelo Córdoba at esmas

21st-century Argentine male actors
Argentine male television actors
Argentine male telenovela actors
Male actors from Buenos Aires
1973 births
Living people